Louise Renne is a lawyer, former Supervisor and one-time City Attorney for the City and County of San Francisco, California.

She was born to Anne Bartrem Hornbeck (1909 – 2001). She is a graduate of both Michigan State University and Columbia Law School (1961).

Career

Supervisor 
She succeeded to Dianne Feinstein's post as supervisor upon Feinstein succeeding George Moscone as mayor in 1978.

City attorney 
Renne served in the seat until 1986, when she resigned to accept Feinstein's appointment of her as City Attorney, succeeding George Agnost to become the first female City Attorney in San Francisco history. At one time in the early 2000s, she was the direct supervisor of Kamala Harris, the current Vice President of the United States.

Renne began the investigation into corruption in the San Francisco Unified School District's facilities department after being asked by Superintendent Arlene Ackerman.

She served in the position until 2001 and was succeeded by Dennis Herrera.

Private practice 
Renne is a founding partner at the law firm Renne Public Law Group LLP.

References

San Francisco City Attorneys
Living people
20th-century American women lawyers
20th-century American lawyers
Columbia Law School alumni
Michigan State University alumni
San Francisco Board of Supervisors members
Women city councillors in California
Year of birth missing (living people)
21st-century American women lawyers
21st-century American lawyers
20th-century American women politicians
20th-century American politicians
21st-century American women politicians
21st-century American politicians